The following places in Quebec, Canada are named Sainte-Angèle:
Sainte-Angèle-de-Laval, Quebec
Sainte-Angèle-de-Mérici, Quebec
Sainte-Angèle-de-Prémont, Quebec
Sainte-Angèle-de-Monnoir, Quebec